Bertie O'Brien (1951 – 2 March 2023) was an Irish hurler and Gaelic footballer. He played at club level with St. Finbarr's and was a dual player at various levels with Cork.

Career
O'Brien first played Gaelic football and hurling in the Lough Leagues, before later lining out as a schoolboy with Sullivan's Quay CBS. He had his first success at club level when he won a Cork MFC title with St. Finbarr's in 1968. O'Brien was still in his teens when he lined out with the intermediate team before making his senior debut as a dual player.

O'Brien has his first senior successes as a hurler when St. Finbarr's claimed the Cork, Munster and All-Ireland titles during the 1974–75 season. Over the course of the following decade he enjoyed many more successes, including a second All-Ireland club hurling medal in 1978 and All-Ireland club football victories in 1980 and 1981. O'Brien became only the second player since John Lyons to captain his club to hurling football honours. His career effectively ended after breaking his leg in a club game in 1983.

O'Brien first appeared on the inter-county with Cork as goalkeeper on the minor team that beat Derry in the 1969 All-Ireland MFC final. He later claimed provincial titles in the under-21 and junior grades. O'Brien was called for a trial with the Cork senior hurling team, however, he later joined the Cork senior football team and was understudy to goalkeeper Billy Morgan when Cork won the Munster SFC title in 1974. He returned to the senior hurling team for the 1979-80 league but was dropped from the team for the latter stages.

Coaching career
In retirement from playing, O'Brien became active as coach and selector with various St. Finbarr's teams. He was part of the management team when the club won their third All-Ireland club football title in 1987. O'Brien also spent nearly 25 years as a member of the club's hurling committee.

Death
O'Brien died on 2 March 2023, at the age of 71.

Honours

Player

St. Finbarr's
All-Ireland Senior Club Hurling Championship: 1975, 1978
All-Ireland Senior Club Football Championship: 1980, 1981 (c)
Munster Senior Club Hurling Championship: 1974, 1977, 1980 (c)
Munster Senior Club Football Championship: 1979, 1980 (c), 1982
Cork Senior Hurling Championship: 1974, 1980 (c), 1981, 1982
Cork Senior Football Championship: 1976, 1979, 1980, 1982 (c)
Cork Minor Football Championship: 1968

Cork
Munster Senior Football Championship: 1974
Munster Junior Football Championship: 1971 (c)
Munster Under-21 Football Championship: 1971
All-Ireland Minor Football Championship: 1969
Munster Minor Football Championship: 1969

Selector

St. Finbarr's
All-Ireland Senior Club Football Championship: 1987 
Munster Senior Club Football Championship: 1986
Cork Senior Football Championship: 1985

References

1951 births
2023 deaths
St Finbarr's Gaelic footballers
St Finbarr's hurlers
Cork inter-county Gaelic footballers
Cork inter-county hurlers
Dual players
Gaelic football goalkeepers
Gaelic football selectors